Jari Matti Lipponen (born 17 October 1972) is a Finnish former archer who participated in three consecutive Olympic competitions, starting in 1992. He won the silver medal in the Men's Team Competition in 1992 (Barcelona, Spain) alongside Tomi Poikolainen and Ismo Falck.

References
 

1972 births
Living people
People from Kemi
Finnish male archers
Archers at the 1992 Summer Olympics
Archers at the 1996 Summer Olympics
Archers at the 2000 Summer Olympics
Olympic archers of Finland
Olympic silver medalists for Finland
Olympic medalists in archery
Medalists at the 1992 Summer Olympics
Sportspeople from Lapland (Finland)